Alarmel Valli is a leading Indian classical dancer and choreographer and the foremost exponent of the Pandanallur style in the Indian classical dance form, Bharatanatyam. She is widely acclaimed for her ability to turn traditional grammar into deeply internalized, personal dance poetry.

She founded The Dipasikha Dance Foundation in Chennai in 1984, where she teaches Bharatanatyam.

In 1991, Alarmel Valli was the second youngest dancer to be conferred the Padma Shri from the Government of India, after Vyjayanthimala. She was awarded the Sangeet Natak Akademi Award in 2001 by India's National Academy for Music, Dance and Drama, followed by one of India's highest civilian honours – the Padma Bhushan award from the Government of India in 2004 and Chevalier of Arts and Letters award from the Government of France, also in 2004.

Early life
Alarmel Valli was born and brought up in Chennai, where she did her schooling at The Sacred Heart Matriculation School, Church Park, Chennai. She graduated with a Bachelor of ​Arts degree in English literature from Stella Maris College, Chennai. She trained in the Pandanallur style of Bharatanatyam from the age of six under renowned Gurus Pandanallur Chokkalingam Pillai and his son Pandanallur Subbaraya Pillai. She studied music under T. Muktha of the Veena Dhanammal style of music for many years, with a focus on Padams and Javalis. She also trained in Odissi under Guru Kelucharan Mohapatra and his disciple Guru Ramani Ranjan Jena

Career
She made her stage debut at 9 ​½​ at The Indian Institute of Fine Arts, Madras, and was conferred the Natya Kala Bhushan award. She won her laurels on the international scene when she was barely 16 at the International Dance Festival of the prestigious Sarah Bernhardt Théâtre de la Ville in Paris and has performed in landmark theatres and festivals ever since, both in India and aboard.

Her research in classical Tamil literature and the anthologies of the 2000-year-old Sangam poetry has resulted in a significant repertoire of dance poems. Over the years, she has evolved her distinct style within the framework of classical Bharatanatyam.

Among her leading students are Ranee Ramaswamy and Aparna Ramaswamy of the Ragamala Dance Company in Minneapolis and Meenakshi Srinivasan.

Some highlights of Alarmél Valli's international career include her performances at the Bolshoi Theatre, The Vienna International Dance Festival, The Munich Opera Festival, The Edinburgh Festival, The New York International Festival of Arts, The Avignon Festival, The Cervantino Festival, the Lyon Biennale, The Venice Biennale, The Royal Albert Hall and Queen Elizabeth Hall in London, The Helsinki Biennale, The Millennium Festival in Berlin and The Frankfurt Alt Oper. In July 2015, she was the first Indian classical dancer to perform at the Salzburg Festival.

In popular culture

A film on Alarmel Valli was made for the Omnibus series, on BBC One, by producer Michael Macintyre. Alarmel Valli has also been featured in dance documentaries by noted Indian producers like the late G. Aravindan and Prakash Jha, by the BBC (in The Spirit of Asia Series), the Netherlands Broadcasting Company, Arte (France), and Japanese National Television. The Films Division of India commissioned a film, titled 'Pravahi', on her for the National Archives of India.​ It was directed by eminent filmmaker Arun Khopkar, with cinematography by Madhu Ambat. In 2011, Lasya Kavya, a documentary about Alarmel Valli by award-winning director, Sankalp Meshram, won the National Film Award for Best Arts/Cultural Film.

Personal life
Alarmel Valli is married to Bhaskar Ghose, an Indian Administrative Service (IAS) officer.

Selected awards and honours

  1979: State award of Kalaimamani from Tamil Nadu Government
  1980: Nrithya Vikas, from Sur Singar, Mumbai
  1985: Nritya Choodamani, from Krishna Gana Sabha, Chennai.
  1991: Padma Sri from the Government of India.
  1997: Awarded the Grande Medaille (Medal) by the City of Paris.
  2001: Sangeet Natak Akademi Award, New Delhi
  2004: Padma Bhushan from the Government of India
  2004: Chevalier of Arts and Letters award from the Government of France
  2012: Naatya Padmam from Brahma Gana Sabha, Chennai
  2014: Natya Utsav Lifetime Achievement Award from the Bharatiya Vidya Bhavan, Chennai
  2015: Natya Kala Acharya award from The Music Academy, Chennai 
  2018: Nritya Peroli award from Karthik Fine Arts, Chennai

See also
 Bharatnatyam
 Indian women in dance

External links
 Alarmel Valli's Official Website

References

Bharatanatyam exponents
Odissi exponents
Indian dance teachers
1956 births
Living people
University of Madras alumni
Artists from Chennai
Recipients of the Padma Bhushan in arts
Recipients of the Sangeet Natak Akademi Award
Chevaliers of the Ordre des Arts et des Lettres
Performers of Indian classical dance
Indian classical choreographers
Indian female classical dancers
Indian women choreographers
Indian choreographers
Recipients of the Padma Shri in arts
Dancers from Tamil Nadu
20th-century Indian dancers
Women educators from Tamil Nadu
Teachers of Indian classical dance
20th-century Indian educators
20th-century Indian women artists
Women artists from Tamil Nadu
Educators from Tamil Nadu
Stella Maris College, Chennai alumni
20th-century women educators